This is a list of electoral division results for the 2016 Australian federal election in the state of Tasmania.

Overall results

Liberal to Labor: Bass, Braddon, Lyons

Results by division

Bass

Braddon

Denison

Franklin

Lyons

References

Tasmania 2016